The northern Chinese boar (Sus scrofa moupinensis) is a subspecies of wild boar native to China and Vietnam. The subspecies was described by Alphonse Milne-Edwards in 1871. It also occurs in Sichuan. It is likely to be the ancestor of domestic pigs.

References

Mammals described in 1871
Mammals of China
Suidae
Wild boars